Rob Lord (born 1966) is a British film and television composer working primarily between the UK and the US.

Filmography

References

External links
 Rob Lord Official Website
 

1966 births
Living people
Musicians from Coventry
English film score composers
English male film score composers
Video game composers
English atheists